The first Müller senate was the state government of Berlin between 2014 and 2016, sworn in on 11 December 2014 after Michael Müller was elected as Governing Mayor by the members of the Abgeordnetenhaus of Berlin. It was the 26th Senate of Berlin.

It was formed after the resignation of Governing Mayor Klaus Wowereit, and was a continuation of the grand coalition of the Social Democratic Party (SPD) and Christian Democratic Union (CDU) formed after the 2011 Berlin state election. Excluding the Governing Mayor, the senate comprised eight members, called Senators. Four were members of the SPD and four were members of the CDU.

The first Müller senate was succeeded by the second Müller senate on 8 December 2016.

Formation 
The previous Senate was a grand coalition government of the SPD and CDU led by Governing Mayor Klaus Wowereit of the SPD. Wowereit announced his resignation in August 2014, citing continued delays in the opening of the Berlin Brandenburg Airport, which he described as his "biggest failure".

The SPD held a membership ballot to determine his successor; if no candidate received a majority in the initial ballot, a runoff would be held between the top two. Candidates standing for election were Senator for Urban Development Michael Müller, SPD parliamentary leader Raed Saleh, and former state SPD chairman Jan Stöß. The postal vote was held from 19 September to 18 October, with Müller receiving 59.1% of votes, followed by Stöß with 20.8% and Saleh with 18.6%. Approximately 11,000 of the party's 17,200 members voted, corresponding to 64% turnout.

Müller was elected as Governing Mayor by the Abgeordnetenhaus on 11 December, winning 87 votes out of 145 cast.

Composition 
The composition of the Senate at the time of its dissolution was as follows:

References

External links 

Cabinets of Berlin
Cabinets established in 2014
2014 establishments in Germany
2016 disestablishments in Germany
Cabinets disestablished in 2016